Victor Rousseau (Feluy, 16 December 1865 – Forest, 17 March 1954) also known as M. Victor Rousseau, was a Belgian sculptor and medalist.

Biography 

Rousseau was of Walloon heritage and descended from a line of stonemasons.  He began carving stone at age 11, working at the site of the Law Courts of Brussels, designed by architect Joseph Poelaert.  He later apprenticed under sculptor Georges Houtstont, and took classes at the Académie Royale des Beaux-Arts in Brussels.

A winning competition entry for the Prix Godecharle in 1890 gave Rousseau the chance to travel in England, Italy, and two full years in France, after which he returned to the atelier of Belgian sculptor and teacher Charles van der Stappen for another two years, 1887 through 1889.  Rousseau himself served as professor of sculpture at the Académie Royale des Beaux-Arts from 1901 through 1919, and as director from 1919 through 1922 (succeeding van der Stappen in that role) and then again from 1931 through 1935.

Honours 
 1919 : Commander of the Order of the Crown.

Work 

 Le Hibou and Le Perroquet at the Botanical Garden of Brussels, circa 1898
 monument panel to Charles Buls and the builders of the Grand-Place, with architect Victor Horta, 1899
 corner relief panel at the Art Nouveau Hôtel Hannon, for architect Jules Brunfaut, Saint-Gilles, Belgium, 1903
 allegorical statues for the Pont de Fragnée, Liege, circa 1904
 Anglo-Belgian Memorial, Victoria Embankment, London, 1920, with British architect Sir Reginald Blomfield
 monumental figural group Maturity, Montagne du Parc, Brussels, 1922
 bust of Albert Giraud, Josaphat Park, Schaerbeek

References

External links
 

1865 births
1954 deaths
Walloon people
20th-century Belgian sculptors
19th-century Belgian sculptors
19th-century Belgian male artists
Commanders of the Order of the Crown (Belgium)
Académie Royale des Beaux-Arts alumni
Academic staff of the Académie Royale des Beaux-Arts
20th-century Belgian male artists